Miroslav Vraštil may refer to:

 Miroslav Vraštil Sr. (born 1951), Czechoslovakian Olympic rower
 Miroslav Vraštil Jr. (born 1982), Czech Olympic rower; son of the above